Pudukudi North is a village in the [Budalurtaluk]] of Thanjavur district, Tamil Nadu, India.

Demographics 

As per the 2001 census, Pudukudi North had a total population of 3308 with 1677 males and 1631 females. The sex ratio was 973. The literacy rate was 64.56.

References

See also 
 Pudukudi South

Villages in Thanjavur district